The KUR ED1 class was a class of  gauge  steam locomotives built for the Kenya-Uganda Railway (KUR). The 27 members of the ED1 class entered service on the KUR between 1926 and 1930. They were later operated by the KUR's successor, the East African Railways (EAR), and reclassified as part of the EAR 11 class.

In 1930, four similar locomotives were built for the Tanganyika Railway (TR) as the TR ST class. These locomotives differed from the ED1 class units only in being fitted with vacuum brake equipment instead of Westinghouse brakes and air compressor. They, too, were later operated by the EAR, and reclassified as part of the EAR's 11 class.

In fiction
Nia, a character in Thomas & Friends who was introduced in 2018 (season 22), is based on the KUR ED1 class. She, however, is standard-gauge.

See also

History of rail transport in Tanzania
Rail transport in Kenya
Rail transport in Uganda

References

Notes

Bibliography

External links

Bagnall locomotives
East African Railways locomotives
Kenya-Uganda Railway locomotives
Metre gauge steam locomotives
Railway locomotives introduced in 1926
Steam locomotives of Kenya
Steam locomotives of Tanzania
Steam locomotives of Uganda
Tanganyika Railway locomotives
Vulcan Foundry locomotives
2-6-2T locomotives